Statistics of UAE Football League in season 1982/83.

Overview
Al Wasl FC won the championship.

League standings

References
United Arab Emirates - List of final tables (RSSSF)

UAE Pro League seasons
United
1982–83 in Emirati football